Dikson Airport  is a small commercial airport in Russia located  west of the urban-type settlement of Dikson on a small island. The airport is owned by KrasAvia. It primarily services small transport aircraft. Central Intelligence Agency reports from 1952 released under the Freedom of Information Act indicate that the USSR was using Dikson as a staging airfield for Tupolev Tu-4 (NATO reporting name: Bull) aircraft.

Airlines and destinations

References

Airports built in the Soviet Union
Airports in Krasnoyarsk Krai

Soviet Long Range Aviation Arctic staging bases